This is the discography of rapper Napoleon.

Albums

Solo albums 
Napoleon Presents Tha Bonaparz (Unreleased)
Released: 2001
Label: ---
Have Mercy (Unreleased)
Released: 2005
Label: ---
Napoleon Presents Loyalty Over Money
Released: October 3, 2006
Label: Paid in Full Entertainment, Loyalty Entertainment LLC, Koch Entertainment

Collaboration albums
Still I Rise (with Outlawz)
Released: December 21, 1999
Label: Amaru Entertainment, Death Row Records, Interscope Records
Ride wit Us or Collide wit Us (with Outlawz)
Released: November 7, 2000
Label: Outlaw Recordz, Bayside Entertainment
Novakane (with Outlawz)
Released: October 23, 2001
Label: Outlaw Recordz, Koch Records
Neva Surrenda (with Outlawz)
Released: October 22, 2002
Label: Outlaw Recordz, Rap-A-Lot Records

Guest appearances

1999: "Ain't Died In Vain" (Rondo feat. E.D.I., Young Noble, Storm, Napoleon)
2001: "All Out" (2Pac feat. E.D.I., Kastro & Napoleon)
2002: "Gotz 2 Go" (Young Noble feat. Muszamil, Homicide & Napoleon)
2002: "Ball or Die" (Hellraza feat. E.D.I., Kastro, Young Noble & Napoleon)
2002: "Born A Souljah" (Kastro & E.D.I. feat. Young Noble, Yukmouth, Muszamil & Napoleon)
2004: "Tha Life That We Live" (Cablez feat. Napoleon, Muszamil & Nzingha Shakur)
2004: "Reign Supreme" (Louie Loc feat. Napoleon)
2005: "Money World" (Killa Tay feat. Napoleon, Missippi & Luni Coleone)

Hip hop discographies
Discographies of American artists